The Speaker of the Andhra Pradesh Legislative Assembly is the presiding officer of the Legislative Assembly of Andhra Pradesh, the main law-making body for the Indian state of Andhra Pradesh.

In the Republic of India, the various central and state legislatures are presided by either a Speaker or a Chairman. The Speaker is elected in the very first meeting of the Andhra Pradesh Legislative Assembly after the General elections for a term of 5 years from amongst the members of the Saasana Sabha. The Speaker holds office until either they ceases to be a member of the Saasana Sabha or he himself resigns. The Speaker can be removed from office by a resolution passed in the Saasana Sabha by an effective majority of its members. In the absence of a Speaker, the meeting of Andhra Pradesh Legislative Assembly is presided over by the Deputy Speaker.

List of speakers

List of deputy speakers

References

External links
 

 
Andhra Pradesh
Lists of people from Andhra Pradesh